Oak Tree Fine Press is a small not-for-profit publishing house set up with the support of Nobel Laureate John Maxwell Coetzee. It publishes limited edition hand-bound signed books pairing  leading writers and artists to publish works of modern literary fiction.

All proceeds from the sales of books by Oak Tree Fine Press are targeted at organizations which offer support to the child victims of the African HIV/AIDS crisis.

Oak Tree Press was founded in 2006 and is based in Hertfordshire, UK. It is primarily a volunteer organisation.

Series published by Oak Tree Press

The First Chapter Series (Booker Prize)
This series is a collaboration between Booker Prize-winning writers and high-profile artists to raise money for organizations offering care and support to AIDS orphans and victims in Africa. Each volume features the opening chapters of a Booker Prize-winning novel, accompanied by original artwork inspired by the novel. Contributors include J M Coetzee, Stanley Middleton, Nadine Gordimer, Barry Unsworth, Margaret Atwood, A. S. Byatt, Alan Hollinghurst, Salman Rushdie, Yoko Ono, Gilbert & George, Thomas Keneally, Antony Gormley, Cyril Coetzee, Ezekiel Mabote, Colbert Mashile, and Jo Ractliffe.

Nobel Lectures
These volumes contain the full text of the lecture presented by Noble Laureates to the Swedish Academy after their Nobel Prize in Literature acceptance. The lectures of Doris Lessing, Günter Grass, and Toni Morrison have so far been produced

Modern Classics
Contributors to this series include John le Carré and Philip Pullman.

Open Book
Open Book is a series presenting books as art. First in the series is the reproduction of Beloved by Toni Morrison

J M Coetzee Series
Features signed extracts from the novels of J M Coetzee.

References

Book publishing companies of the United Kingdom
HIV/AIDS organisations in the United Kingdom
Non-profit organisations based in England
Organisations based in Oxford
Retail companies of England
Organizations established in 2005
Publishing companies established in 2005
Retail companies established in 2005
2005 establishments in England